Paranormal fiction is a genre of fiction whose story lines revolve around the paranormal.

Sub genres

 Paranormal romance
 Urban fantasy

Television
The X-Files, a suspense drama television series in which characters investigate various paranormal phenomena.
So Weird, a Disney adventure drama television show about an unorthodox American family and its experiences with paranormal phenomena, starring Mackenzie Phillips, Cara DeLizia and Alexz Johnson.
Supernatural, a television drama in which two brothers battle paranormal forces.
Ghost Whisperer
The River (U.S. TV series), a new television drama in which characters searching for a missing person in the Amazon find a paranormal being threatening their lives.
Stranger Things, a Netflix tv series about a little boy's disappearance and a peculiar little girl's reappearance. The little boy's friends, family, and the local sheriff all try to figure out what is going on, as they race against time and government officials who are trying to stop them.

Film
The Exorcist, a 1973 horror film.
Poltergeist, a 1982 horror film.
The Entity, a 1982 suspense film about a single mother repeatedly raped by a spirit.
Ghostbusters, a 1984 adventure comedy film about three unemployed parapsychology professors who set up shop as a unique ghost-removal service.
Ghostbusters II, a 1989 sequel to the first movie.
Ghostbusters: Afterlife, a 2021 sequel to the first movie.
Ghostbusters (2016), a remake to the first movie.
Paranormal Activity, a 2007 horror film.

References